Robert Edward Series ('Bertie') Baigent (born 26 March 1995 in Oxford) is a British conductor, composer, and organist.

Biography
Baigent’s aunt is the mathematician Caroline Series.  His grandfather was the physicist George Series.  Baigent read music at Jesus College, Cambridge, where he was an organ scholar (2013) and where his teachers included Benjamin Walton.  He subsequently completed an MA at the Royal Academy of Music in 2018, where his instructors included Sian Edwards.

Conducting career
Baigent was conductor of the Cambridge University Symphony Orchestra, and subsequently of the London Young Sinfonia from 2016 to 2018.  Baigent has been music director of Waterperry Opera Festival since 2017.  From 2018 until 2020, he was the assistant conductor of the Colorado Symphony and principal guest conductor of the Denver Young Artists Orchestra.

In February 2022, the City of Birmingham Symphony Orchestra appointed Baigent as one of its new roster of six assistant conductors.  In June 2022, Baigent was awarded the Grand Prix for the best overall performance at the inaugural International Conducting Competition Rotterdam, as well as winning the Classical Award and the Symphony Award.  Subsequently also in June 2022, the Rotterdam Philharmonic Orchestra appointed Baigent as its new assistant conductor.

Compositional career
Baigent has won prizes in numerous composition competitions, including the Stainer and Bell Award for Choral Composition, the BBC Inspire Competition 2013, and the NCEM Young Composers Award. His work Joie de Vivre was commissioned for and played at the unveiling of a plaque to mark the first performance of Beethoven's Ninth Symphony in the City of Westminster. Baigent's compositions have been performed by the Orchestra of the Royal Opera House under Antonio Pappano, the Aurora Orchestra under Nicholas Collon, the Bath Philharmonia and Fretwork.  In 2015, a recording of his organ work Bright spark, shot from a brighter place was released by the German CD label JUBAL. His new opera Paradise Lost, based on Milton’s eponymous epic poem, is scheduled to premiere in London in August 2022.

References

External links
 Official website of Bertie Baigent
 Askonas Holt agency page on Bertie Baigent
 Royal Academy of Music, alumnus profile of Bertie Baigent
 International Conducting Competition Rotterdam page on Bertie Baigent

1995 births
Living people
Musicians from Oxford
Alumni of Jesus College, Cambridge
English conductors (music)
British male conductors (music)
English classical organists
British male organists
Fellows of the Royal College of Organists
English classical composers
21st-century British conductors (music)
21st-century organists
21st-century British male musicians
Male classical organists